The 2nd Pakistan International Screen Awards, known as PISA 2021, were held on 5 November 2021 in Dubai.

Pyar Ke Sadqay won the most awards, with 3 awards. Film nominations were not announced as no films were released in the country due to Covid–19 pandemic.

Winners and nominees 
Nominees for PISA 2021 were announced on 6 September 2021. For the first time, jury categories were introduced.

Television

Music

Fashion

Digital content

References 

Pakistani television awards
Pakistani film awards
2021 film awards
2021 television awards
2020s in Dubai
November 2021 events in the United Arab Emirates